Macular dystrophy may refer to any of these eye diseases:

 Macular corneal dystrophy, a rare pathological condition
 Macular degeneration, or age-related macular degeneration
 Vitelliform macular dystrophy, an irregular autosomal dominant eye disorder